My Favorite Year is a 1982 American comedy film released by Metro-Goldwyn-Mayer, directed by Richard Benjamin and written by Norman Steinberg and Dennis Palumbo from a story written by Palumbo. The film tells the story of a young comedy writer and stars Peter O'Toole, Mark Linn-Baker, Jessica Harper, and Joseph Bologna. O'Toole was nominated for the Academy Award for Best Actor. The film was adapted into an unsuccessful 1992 Broadway musical of the same name.

Plot
Benjy Stone, the narrator, recalls the week (in his "favorite year" of 1954) when he met his idol, swashbuckling actor Alan Swann (inspired by Errol Flynn, whose title roles such as that in Captain Blood would be evoked by Swann's imagined one in Captain from Tortuga). During television's early days, Benjy works as a junior comedy writer for a variety show called Comedy Cavalcade starring Stan "King" Kaiser that is broadcast live from the NBC studios at 30 Rockefeller Plaza. Swann, well past his prime, is booked as a guest star and arrives at the studio drunk. Kaiser nearly removes Swann from the show until Benjy intervenes, promising to keep Swann sober during the week preceding his scheduled appearance.
 
With help from Swann's chauffeur Alfie, Benjy continuously monitors Swann. They learn much about each other, finding out that they each have family whom they want to remain out of the spotlight. Benjy's Jewish mother is married to Filipino former bantamweight boxer Rookie Carroca, and Benjy has embarrassing, uncouth relatives, including Uncle Morty. Swann's young daughter Tess has been raised entirely by her mother, one of his many ex-wives. He rarely visits but secretly keeps tabs on her, unable to muster the courage to reconnect with her.
 
During the week of rehearsals, Kaiser is threatened by gangster Karl Rojeck, a corrupt union boss who objects to being parodied on the show. Disruptive events, ambiguous between real sabotage and random accidents, are noted after Kaiser belligerently insists on performing the "Boss Hijack" sketch.

Benjy clumsily and overenthusiastically courts K.C. Downing, producer Leo Silver's pretty assistant. Swann mentors Benjy, and Benjy is unable to prevent the drunken star from crashing a party at the home of K.C.'s affluent parents as they find themselves in the wrong apartment.
 
The night of the show, Swann suffers a panic attack after Benjy informs him that the program is broadcast live, not filmed as Swann had expected. Swann becomes drunk and flees the studio. Benjy angrily confronts him, telling Swann that he always believed that he was the swashbuckling hero whom he had watched on the silver screen and that deep down, Swann possesses those qualities.
 
As the "Boss Hijack" sketch gets under way, Rojeck's men appear backstage and attack Kaiser. The fight spills onto the stage during the live broadcast, and the audience believes that it is part of the sketch. Swann and Benjy observe the melee from the balcony. Swann, dressed for a musketeer skit, grabs a rope and swings onto the stage and into action. He and Kaiser defeat the thugs together before the unwitting audience.
 
Benjy narrates the epilogue, relating that Swann, his confidence bolstered, visits his daughter the next day, enjoying a heartfelt reunion.

Cast

Future Phil Spector murder victim Lana Clarkson appears (uncredited) as the girl in the Old Gold cigarette box. Gloria Stuart appears in a non-speaking role as Mrs. Horn.

Relationship to real life
Executive producer Mel Brooks was a writer for the Sid Caesar variety program Your Show of Shows early in his career. Brooks has claimed that movie swashbuckler Errol Flynn was a guest on one episode, and that the appearance inspired Dennis Palumbo's largely fictional screenplay. He also said that Swann was based on Flynn, and Benjy Stone is based on both Brooks and Woody Allen, who also wrote for Caesar.

According to Brooks, the character Rookie Carroca was based on a Filipino sailor in the U.S. Navy who was his neighbor in Brooklyn. The name of the King Kaiser character is based on that of Sid Caesar ("Kaiser" is the German equivalent of the Roman title Caesar). Selma Diamond, another former Your Show of Shows writer (who inspired Rose Marie's character on The Dick Van Dyke Show), appears in the film as a wardrobe mistress.

The character Herb, a comedy writer who whispers rather than speaks, is based on Neil Simon, another of Caesar's staff writers, who, according to Carl Reiner, whispered ideas to colleagues rather than trying to shout to be heard above the din of the noisy writers' room.
 
Brooks acknowledges that most of the film's plot is fictional. He said that Flynn's appearance on Your Show of Shows was uneventful and that none of the writers had much interaction with Flynn, became his friend or took him home to dinner.

Production
The film was based on an original script by Norman Steinberg.

My Favorite Year was the first film directed by actor Richard Benjamin, who was an NBC page at 30 Rockefeller Plaza in 1956.

Cameron Mitchell recalled that he met Mel Brooks when both were having lunch at the Metro-Goldwyn-Mayer commissary. Brooks told him that Gorilla at Large (which starred Mitchell and Brooks' wife Anne Bancroft) was his favorite film and asked him if he wanted to play a Jimmy Hoffa-type character in a film that he was producing at MGM. Mitchell accepted and was cast in My Favorite Year as Karl "Boss" Rojeck.

Reception
My Favorite Year opened in theaters on October 1, 1982, to $2,400,696 (#3, behind An Officer and a Gentlemens 11th weekend and E.T. the Extra-Terrestrials 18th).

In a contemporary review for The New York Times, critic Janet Maslin called My Favorite Year "a funny and good-natured comedy" and wrote that director Richard Benjamin "works in a steady, affable style that is occasionally inspired, always snappy and never less than amusing."

The film holds a 96% "fresh" rating with review aggregator Rotten Tomatoes based on 28 reviews with the consensus: "My Favorite Year is a joyful ode to the early days of television, carried with a deft touch and Peter O'Toole's uproariously funny performance."

Musical
Lainie Kazan was the only member of the cast to reprise her film role for the 1992 Broadway musical version of My Favorite Year, in which Alan Swann was portrayed by Tim Curry and Alice Miller by Andrea Martin. All three were nominated for Tony Awards for their performances, with Martin winning her category.

References

External links

 
 
 
 
 
 

1982 films
1982 comedy films
American comedy films
Films set in 1954
Films about screenwriters
Films about actors
Films about alcoholism
Films about television
Films set in New York City
Films directed by Richard Benjamin
Films produced by Mel Brooks
Brooksfilms films
Metro-Goldwyn-Mayer films
Films à clef
1982 directorial debut films
Films with screenplays by Norman Steinberg
1980s English-language films
1980s American films